During World War II, the United States Army Air Forces (USAAF) established numerous airfields in Utah for training pilots and aircrews of USAAF fighters and bombers.

Most of these airfields were under the command of Second Air Force or the Army Air Forces Training Command (AAFTC) (A predecessor of the current-day United States Air Force Air Education and Training Command). However the other USAAF support commands (Air Technical Service Command (ATSC); Air Transport Command (ATC) or Troop Carrier Command) commanded a significant number of airfields in a support roles.

It is still possible to find remnants of these wartime airfields. Many were converted into municipal airports, some were returned to agriculture and several were retained as United States Air Force installations and were front-line bases during the Cold War. Hundreds of the temporary buildings that were used survive today, and are being used for other purposes.

Major Airfields
Proving Ground Command
 Dugway Army Air Field, Tooele
 Now:  Michael Army Airfield
 Part of: Dugway Proving Ground (United States Army)

Air Technical Service Command
 Hill Field, Clearfield
 Ogden Air Depot, 12 January 1939-3 January 1955
 482nd Base Headquarters and Air Base Squadron, 2 January 1943-1 April 1944
 4135th Army Air Force Base Unit, 1 April 1944-28 August 1948
 Now:  Hill Air Force Base
 And:  Ogden Air Logistics Center
 Hinckley Field, Ogden
 Sub-base of Hill AAF
 Now: Ogden-Hinckley Airport 

Army Air Forces Training Command
 Kearns Army Air Base
 Army Air Forces Replacement Training Center/Army Air Forces Basic Training Center No.5, 1 May 1942-30 September 1943
 Army Air Forces Overseas Replacement Depot, 20 July 1942-30 April 1944
 Assigned to Second Air Force, 1 October 1943
 363rd Base Headquarters and Air Base Squadron, 1 October 1943-24 March 1944
 Operational airfield of Kearns Army Air Base (AAFTC)
 Now: South Valley Regional Airport 

 Salt Lake City AAB/APT, Salt Lake City
 Joint Use USAAF/Civil Airport as freight terminal
 Now: Salt Lake City International Airport 
 And:  Salt Lake City Air National Guard Base

 Wendover Field, Wendover, Utah
 Was: Wendover Air Force Base (1947-1965)
 Now: Wendover Airport 
 Auxiliary fields: (Delle AF Aux , Knolls CAA , Low Flight Strip)
 Note: Delle was reported to have had an "asterisk" type layout, runways under 2000' in length.  Aux to Wendover AAF and to Salt Lake City AAB.  Later taken over by a private person and some remains can be seen.  Two of the runways were paved by the new owner and can be seen still.  It has been reported that occasionally aircraft have been seen there, assume private and uncharted and unlisted.  No other data on this field exists.  Status assumed closed.
 Note: Knolls was a 3000x3000' all way field; clay. used by Wendover as an Aux for light aircraft (e.g.L4).  Some indications that a few P-47 ops took place as well

References

 
 
 
 Thole, Lou (1999), Forgotten Fields of America : World War II Bases and Training, Then and Now - Vol. 2.  Pictorial Histories Pub . 
 Military Airfields in World War II - Utah

External links

 01
Military history of Utah
Utah
Formerly Used Defense Sites in Utah
United States World War II army airfields